Bega Dairy & Drinks is a subsidiary of Australian diversified food company the Bega Group, having been purchased from the Japanese company Kirin (who owns Lion in Australia) in November 2020. While owned by Kirin, it was known as Lion Dairy & Drinks.

It specialises in dairy food and juice, with core activities in milk, yoghurt, cream, dairy desserts, juice and speciality cheese.

History
National Foods was created by the Adelaide Steamship Company in 1991 by amalgamating several dairy and food related businesses with brand names and histories dating back to the 19th century.

San Miguel Corporation of the Philippines entered a bidding war for National Foods with New Zealand's Fonterra in 2004. National Foods board unanimously accepted the San Miguel Corporation offer. In 2005 San Miguel acquired National Foods for $1.8 billion. The Australian Competition and Consumer Commission had earlier signed off on San Miguel Corporation's various Australian acquisitions, noting "there is no overlap between San Miguel's different activities in Australia and hence no change likely to the different markets in which these businesses operate." National Foods had earlier sold its juice business to Berri Ltd. After their acquisition National Foods regained 100% ownership of Berri Ltd. in December 2005. The two operations began the merger process soon afterwards. Following the merger, National Foods became the largest citrus and fruit processor in Australia, packaging approximately 50% of all fruit juice beverages sold in Australia. This led to National Foods having 3500 employees and 20 processing plants around Australia and New Zealand, with seven milk plants, five juice plants, four speciality cheese plants, a cheese packaging plant, two dairy foods plants and a joint venture soy beverage plant.

On 8 November 2007, San Miguel Corp. sold National Foods to Japan's Kirin Holdings Co. (which had a 20% stake in San Miguel) for $3.1 billion, National Foods became a wholly owned subsidiary of Kirin.

In 2008 National Foods acquired Australian dairy company Dairy Farmers and in 2009, when Kirin Holdings acquired Lion Nathan, National Foods and Lion Nathan were merged to create "Lion Nathan National Foods" (San Miguel no longer had any working relations with Australia).

In 2011, "Lion Nathan National Foods" separated into two divisions – Lion and Lion Dairy & Drinks.

In 2015, Warrnambool Cheese and Butter (owned by Saputo Inc.) paid  for a part of Lion Dairy & Drinks' business, including the cheese brands Cracker Barrel and COON.

On 25 November 2019, it was announced that China's Mengniu Dairy had purchased Lion Dairy from Kirin, for approximately A$600 million (US$407 million). The deal was not opposed by the Australian Competition & Consumer Commission, but was rejected by Treasurer Josh Frydenberg. On 25 August 2020, Kirin, the parent company of Lion, announced the sales has collapsed. In November 2020, the business was sold to Bega Cheese  for A$534 million.

Today

Bega Dairy & Drinks processing factories are located at Chelsea Heights and Morwell in Victoria; Baulkham Hills, Penrith and Hexham in New South Wales; Crestmead in Queensland; Jervois and Clarence Gardens in South Australia; Bentley in Western Australia and Canberra in Australian Capital Territory.

The company is a major milk producer in Australia with its flagship Pura brand. It is also a major juice producer and a leader in the fresh dairy products market. As of 2007, National Foods has almost half the national flavoured milk market with the brand Big M, and Farmers Union Iced Coffee has the unusual distinction of being one of only three soft drinks to outsell Coca-Cola in its market-place. National Foods also manufactures yoghurt, fromage frais, dairy desserts, cream and cheese under brands that include Yoplait, Frûche, Divine Classic, YoGo and Farmers Union. The company also produces a range of premium speciality cheeses under brands such as King Island Dairy, South Cape, Tilba, Timboon and Clover Creek.

Brands 
Bega Dairy & Drink's core brands are produced from a total of 24 major facilities (19 in Australia, 1 in New Zealand, 2 in Malaysia, 2 in Indonesia) – some of the brands are listed below:

Company milestones 
1991 – Listed on Australia Stock Exchange;
1992 – Acquired NSW dairy company United Dairies;
1994 – Acquired Masters Dairy in Western Australia;
1995 – Secured Australian license for French brand Yoplait. Sales of Yoplait brand started in the following year;
1999 – Pura brand became Australia's first and only national milk brand;
2000 – Acquired Big M brand;
2001 – Acquired King Island Company. Entered into speciality cheese market;
2002 – Won first national supermarket house brand milk contract;
2005 – Acquired by San Miguel Corporation; San Miguel subsidiary Berri Limited merged with National Foods;
2006 – Acquired speciality cheese manufacturer Lactos Pty Ltd;
2007 – Acquired by Kirin Holdings Company, Limited;
2008 – Planned acquisition of Dairy Farmers (as Australian Co-operative Foods Limited)
2009 – Kirin Holdings gained shareholder approval to acquire 100% of Lion, creating "Lion Nathan National Foods"
2011 – Lion Nathan National Foods becomes Lion and Lion Dairy & Drinks.
2020 – Lion Dairy & Drinks acquired by Bega Cheese.

Industrial relations 
In early October 2009, National Foods gave evidence at an Australian Senate inquiry into milk prices; the Tasmanian Farmers and Graziers Association (TFGA) was concerned because National Foods was paying Tasmanian farmers only 29 cents a litre for milk, about 10c/L below the amount it costs to produce the milk.

References

External links

National Foods Website

Agriculture companies of Australia
Dairy products companies of Australia
Kirin Group
Food and drink companies of Australia
Bega Valley Shire